A tagada is an amusement ride made by various manufacturers. Riders sit in a round bowl with no seatbelts or restraints. There are bars behind the riders which they hold on to. The ride starts to spin, the music starts playing and pneumatic arms bounce the riders up and down.

The Tagada is operated by a human operator who will synchronize the bounces with the music beat. Most operators give time for riders to get to their seats again before making the ride bounce (this occurs if turbulence is too strong). Sometimes riders will be told the ride is over and the gates will not open and the operator will restart the ride making everyone fall over and then open the gates.

Tagada rides are often associated with injuries, including at Yarm Fair 2005 when Bradley Pennicott of the Kingsmead estate, Eaglescliffe, snapped his left arm whilst on the ride. It is suspected that Bradley was malnourished which contributed to the injury. Common also are ejections from the ride, such as 20 June 2011 in Newcastle, or during the 2008 British Grand Prix or October 2009, or most recently in 2016 in Ayr, Scotland where three riders got launched from the ride.  Most injuries are broken bones of riders who fall into the middle of the ride.  Many street fairs ban tagada rides due to their generally poor safety records and cleanliness. The rides are banned in the United States and Australia due to these issues.
At least two deaths are documented, both in Italy where the ride is very common in traveling carnivals. The first happened in Alezio, Apulia in 2016, when a 15 year old boy struck his head while riding; the second in Galliate, Piedmont in 2022, claiming the life of a 15 year old girl who was thrown out of the ride and struck a tree stump.

References

Amusement rides